Echo Mountain is the fifth studio album of the Belgian rock band K's Choice. After a reunion concert at Dranouter festival in August 2009 the band started recording new material in the Echo Mountain Studios in Asheville, North Carolina. On 22 February 2010 they confirmed on their website that the new album would be released on 26 March 2010. "When I Lay Beside You" (#3 at the singles charts) and "Come Live The Life" were released as singles.

Track listing

Personnel
Musicians:
 Sam Bettens
 Gert Bettens
 Eric Grossman
 Koen Lieckens
 Reinout Swinnen
 Thomas Vanelslander

Charts performance

Weekly charts

Year-end charts

Single charts

References

External links
Album track list
Photos from the recording session

2010 albums
K's Choice albums